Russell Paul Hill (9 March 1920 – 19 November 1987) was an Australian rules footballer who played with Essendon in the Victorian Football League (VFL). He played in Essendon's semi final team in 1946, but was dropped for the Grand Final, which Essendon won.

Hill originally played with the Beechworth Stars FC in the Bright / Myrtlford Football League, before playing with Beechworth in the Ovens & King Football League.

He served in the Royal Australian Air Force during the later part of World War II.

Notes

External links 

Essendon Football Club past player profile

1920 births
1987 deaths
Australian rules footballers from Victoria (Australia)
Essendon Football Club players
Royal Australian Air Force personnel of World War II
Royal Australian Air Force airmen
Military personnel from Victoria (Australia)
People from Beechworth